Ipswich West is an electoral district of the Legislative Assembly in the Australian state of Queensland.

The district takes in western parts of suburban Ipswich, as well as rural areas further west. It was first created for the 1960 election.

Members for Ipswich West

Election results

References

External links
 
 2017 State General Election - Ipswich West - District Summary (Electoral Commission of Queensland)

Ipswich West